Chris Harris may refer to:

Sportspeople
 Chris Harris (basketball) (born 1933), English basketballer
 Chris Harris (cricketer) (born 1969), New Zealand cricketer
 Chris Harris (darts player), Welsh darts player
 Chris Harris (rower) (born 1985), New Zealand rower
 Chris Harris (rugby union) (born 1990), English born, Scottish rugby union player
 Chris Harris (safety) (born 1982), American football coach and former NFL player
 Chris Harris (speedway rider) (born 1982), English motorcycle speedway rider
 Chris Harris (wrestler) (born 1973), American professional wrestler
 Chris Harris Jr. (born 1989), American football cornerback for the New Orleans Saints

Others
 Chris Harris (actor) (1942–2014), English performer and writer specialising in pantomime and comic acting
 Chris Harris (journalist) (born 1975), English automotive journalist and automotive racing driver
 Chris Harris (New South Wales politician) (born 1951), City of Sydney councillor and Green politician
 Chris Harris (Texas politician) (1948–2015), Texas State Representative and State Senator
 Zeuss (Chris Harris, born 1972), American record producer, mixer, guitarist, and songwriter

See also
 Chris (name)
 Harris (disambiguation)
 Christopher Harris (disambiguation)
 Christine Harris (disambiguation)
 Christie Harris
 Chris Heaton-Harris (born 1967), British Conservative Party politician